The , also called  was a pair of large, aircraft-carrying cruiser submarines built for the Imperial Japanese Navy (IJN) during World War II.

Design and description
The Type AM submarines were versions of the preceding A2 class with the command facilities replaced by an enlarged aircraft hangar, which was fitted for a pair of Aichi M6A1 floatplane bombers. They displaced  surfaced and  submerged.

The machinery was reduced in power from the A2-class boats. For surface running, the boats were powered by two  diesel engines, each driving one propeller shaft. When submerged each propeller was driven by a  electric motor. They could reach  on the surface and  underwater.

The boats were armed with six internal bow  torpedo tubes and carried a total of a dozen torpedoes. They were also armed with a single /40 deck gun and two triple and one single mount for  Type 96 anti-aircraft guns.

In comparison to the A2 class, the aircraft hangar was enlarged to accommodate two aircraft. It was offset to the right of, and was faired into the base of, the conning tower which protruded over the left side of the hull. A single catapult was positioned on the forward deck. Two folding cranes on the forward deck were used to recover the floatplanes.

Boats
Seven units were ordered, but only two were completed, while construction of two more was abandoned in March 1945. Construction of the remaining three submarines never started.

  surrendered at sea at the end of the war, and was scuttled off Oahu in 1946.
 I-15 was converted to a tanker submarine in June 1945, 90% complete, scrapped in 1945.
 I-1 was 70% complete, sunk by a typhoon on 18 September 1945; later salvaged and scrapped.
 No.5094, No.5095, and No.5096 were cancelled in 1943.

See also
 I-400 class submarine - 3-aircraft submarine with catapult launcher
 Submarine aircraft carrier

Notes

References
 

Submarine aircraft carriers
Submarine classes